The 2013–14 Utah Utes women's basketball team will represent the University of Utah during the 2013–14 NCAA Division I men's basketball season. They will play their home games at the Jon M. Huntsman Center in Salt Lake City, Utah and are a member of the Pac-12 Conference. The Utes are led by their fourth year head coach Anthony Levrets. They finished with a record of 12–19 overall, 4–14 in Pac-12 play for an eleventh-place finish. They lost in the quarterfinals in the 2014 Pac-12 Conference women's basketball tournament to Oregon State.

Roster

Schedule and results 
All home games and conference road games will be broadcast on television on Pac-12 Rocky Mountain or Pac-12 Digital. All games will be broadcast on the radio and streamed online by KALL 700 Sports, home of the Utah Utes.

|-
!colspan=9 | Exhibition

|-
!colspan=9 | Regular Season

|-
!colspan=9| 2014 Pac-12 Conference women's basketball tournament

See also
2013–14 Utah Utes men's basketball team

References 

Utah
Utah Utes
Utah Utes
Utah Utes women's basketball seasons